Aygün Kazımova, Vol. 4 studio album by Azerbaijani singer Aygun Kazimova, released on February 25, 2008, by Süper Müzik Yapım.

Track listing

References

2008 albums
Aygün Kazımova albums